Aldona Grigaliūnienė is a Paralympian athlete from Lithuania competing mainly in category F37-38 shot put events. She won at the 2004 paralympics but she was beaten to silver in 2008.

Life 
She competed in the 1996 Summer Paralympics in Seoul, South Korea. There she won a gold medal in the women's F34-37 long jump event.

After missing the 2000 Summer Paralympics she returned to the 2004 Summer Paralympics in Athens, Greece. There she won a gold medal in the women's F37-38 shot put event.  Four years later in 2008 in Beijing, People's Republic of China she failed in defending her title winning the silver medal and losing out to Mi Na of China.

References

Paralympic athletes of Lithuania
Athletes (track and field) at the 1996 Summer Paralympics
Athletes (track and field) at the 2004 Summer Paralympics
Athletes (track and field) at the 2008 Summer Paralympics
Paralympic gold medalists for Lithuania
Paralympic silver medalists for Lithuania
Living people
World record holders in Paralympic athletics
Medalists at the 1996 Summer Paralympics
Medalists at the 2004 Summer Paralympics
Medalists at the 2008 Summer Paralympics
Year of birth missing (living people)
Paralympic medalists in athletics (track and field)
Lithuanian female shot putters
Lithuanian female long jumpers